Henry Wandal Yager (bef May 12, 1802 – January 9, 1860) was a farmer, businessman and political figure in Upper Canada.

He was born in Claverack, Columbia County, New York, in 1802, the son of Wandal Yager and Eva Dings. The family moved to Upper Canada and settled in Thurlow Township, Hastings County, Ontario about 1800. He was not a United Empire Loyalist. He married Elizabeth White, daughter of Reuben White who was also elected to the Legislative Assembly of Upper Canada.

From the land records, it appears that he was an active speculator frequently buying and selling land in the area and is often referred to as a merchant in the deeds though no record of his business has been found. In 1834, Yager was elected to the 12th Legislative Assembly of Upper Canada session for Hastings. He was a reformer. Thirteen letters were saved by the family from his political years and are now held by the Archives of Canada and called the Henry W Yager Fonds.

In 1847, he left Canada and took his family to Wisconsin, where he bought a farm in Dane County, Wisconsin about 4 miles from Madison, near the home of his daughter Lorinda. He died in Dane County in 1860.

References 
 Becoming Prominent: Leadership in Upper Canada, 1791-1841, J.K. Johnson, McGill-Queen's Univ Press, (1989)
 The Rebels of Hastings, Betsy Dewar Boyce, University of Toronto Press, (1992)

External links 
“Henry W Yager of Thurlow Tp, Hastings County”
“Henry W Yager Fonds”

1860 deaths
Members of the Legislative Assembly of Upper Canada
1802 births